Deadly Invasion: The Killer Bee Nightmare is a 1995 American made-for-television natural horror film starring Robert Hays and Nancy Stafford. It originally aired on the Fox Network on March 7, 1995.

Plot
The film opens in rural Texas. A police officer sees a car parked outside an abandoned farmhouse and stops to investigate. A hole has been ripped into one side of the house. He climbs inside and sees some bodies lying on the floor. He tries to wake them up before realizing they are dead. He is then attacked and killed by a swarm of bees.

The film then cuts to Blossom Meadow, California. The Ingram family has just moved there from Boston. Through a series of events, a huge swarm of killer bees invades the town and the family must work together to survive. Eventually, the father manages to pacify the bees using smoke while the rest of the family escape to the barn using an old tunnel. The next day, the family cleans the dead bees out of the house after an exterminator comes to finish them off.

Cast
Robert Hays as Chad Ingram
Nancy Stafford as Karen Ingram
Ryan Phillippe as Tom Redman
Gina Philips as Tracy Ingram
Gregory Gordon as Kevin Ingram
Whitney Danielle Porter as Lucy Ingram
Dennis Christopher as Pruitt Taylor  Beauchamp
Danielle von Zerneck as Linda

References

1995 television films
1995 films
1995 horror films
American natural horror films
American horror television films
Films about bees
Films set in California
Fox network original films
1990s American films